Peter Needham (17 July 1932 – 23 August 2013) was a South African cricketer. He played six first-class matches for Transvaal between 1950 and 1961.

References

External links
 

1932 births
2013 deaths
South African cricketers
Gauteng cricketers
Cricketers from Johannesburg